William Spearman (December 31, 1899 - December 29, 1937) was an American baseball pitcher in the Negro leagues. He played from 1923 to 1929 with several teams. Four of his brothers, Charles, Henry, Clyde, and Codie, and his nephew Fred also played in the Negro leagues.

References

External links
 and Baseball-Reference Black Baseball stats and Seamheads

1899 births
1937 deaths
Cleveland Elites players
Cleveland Hornets players
Memphis Red Sox players
Nashville Elite Giants players
Baseball players from Arkansas
People from Arkadelphia, Arkansas
Baseball pitchers